Facundo de la Torre (also Fernando de la Torre) (1570 – September 25, 1640) was a Catholic prelate who served as the Archbishop of Santo Domingo (1631–1640).

Biography
Facundo de la Torre was born in Sahagún, Spain and ordained a priest in the Order of Saint Benedict. On July 17, 1631, he was appointed by the King of Spain and confirmed by Urban VIII on January 2, 1632, as Archbishop of Santo Domingo. In September 1632, he was consecrated bishop by Fernando Valdés Llano, Bishop of Teruel with Francisco Olivares Maldonado, Auxiliary Bishop of Toledo, and Timoteo Pérez Vargas, Archbishop Emeritus of Baghdad as co-consecrators. He served as Archbishop of Santo Domingo until his death on September 25, 1640. While bishop, he was the principal consecrator of Juan Alonso de Solis y Mendoza, Bishop of Puerto Rico.

References

External links and additional sources
 (for Chronology of Bishops) 
 (for Chronology of Bishops) 

1570 births
1640 deaths
Bishops appointed by Pope Urban VIII
Benedictine bishops
Roman Catholic archbishops of Santo Domingo
17th-century Roman Catholic archbishops in the Dominican Republic